Darreh Eshgoft or Darreh Eshgoft or Darreh Eshgaft or Darreh-ye Eshgaft may refer to:
 Darreh-ye Eshgaft, Chaharmahal and Bakhtiari
 Darreh Eshgoft, Hormozgan
 Darreh Eshgaft, Izeh, Khuzestan Province
 Darreh Eshgaft, Lorestan
 Darreh Eshgoft, South Khorasan

See also
 Dareshgeft (disambiguation)
 Darreh Eshkaft (disambiguation)